Forresteria is an extinct genus of cephalopod belonging to the subclass Ammonoidea. They flourished during the late Turonian and early Coniacian of the Late Cretaceous, and were global in extent. Forresteria alluaudi and Forresteria hobsoni are considered marker fossils for the lower Coniacian in the American West.

Description

Although the whorl section and ornament of Forresteria are variable, it is easily distinguished from Barroisiceras by the presence of mid-lateral tubercles on the inner whorls, which later disappear or fuse with either umbilical or ventrolateral tubercles. Four subgenera are recognized 

 F. (Forresteria):  Whorl section moderately to very inflated. Mid-lateral tubercles fuse with ventrolateral.
 F. (Reesideoceras): Whorl section less inflated than with  F. (Forresteria). Mid-lateral tubercles fuse with the umbilical. Keel disappears on outer whorl leaving venter flat or concave, bordered by ventrolateral clavi. 
 F. (Harleites): Shell compressed, with high keel and steep umbilical wall. Early whorls have weak umbilical, strong mid-lateral, and fine, feeble ventrolateral tubercles. 
 F. (Zumpangoceras): Inclusion doubtful. Known only from crushed specimens from Mexico. Mid lateral tubercle strengthens with age.

Species
species in Forresteria include:
 Forresteria alluaudi (Boule, Lemoine and Thévenin, 1907)
 Forresteria brancoi
 Forresteria hobsoni
 Forresteria neo-mexica
 Forresteria petrocoriensis (Coquand, 1859)
 Forresteria peruana

Forresteria was named for Robert Forrester of Salt Lake City, Utah.

References

Ammonitida genera
Collignoniceratidae
Cretaceous ammonites
Ammonites of North America
Turonian genus first appearances
Coniacian genus extinctions